

Waermund (or Wærmund) was a medieval Bishop of Rochester.

Waermund was consecrated between 781 and 783. He died between October 803 and 804. In 789, the bishop was granted two properties in Kent by King Offa of Mercia.

Citations

References

External links
 

Bishops of Rochester
8th-century English bishops
9th-century English bishops